Windspire may refer to:
Windspire Inc., a defunct American aircraft design firm based in Long Green, Maryland
Windspire Energy, an American manufacturer of wind turbines and solar arrays, located in Reedsburg, Wisconsin